Miles Daniel McAlester (March 21, 1833 – April 23, 1869) was a career United States Army officer and a Union Army major during the American Civil War. In 1867, he was nominated and confirmed for appointment to the grade of brevet brigadier general in the Regular Army, to rank from April 9, 1865.

Early life and career
McAlester was born in Belfast, New York. He entered the United States Military Academy at West Point in July 1852, and graduated four years later standing third out of 49 cadets. He was appointed a brevet second lieutenant on July 1, 1856, in the coveted Army Engineers. On December 1 he was promoted to second lieutenant.

Civil War service
McAlester was the lead engineer for the Defenses of Washington from April 1861 until March 1862, during which he was promoted to first lieutenant on May 1, 1861. His next assignment was as chief engineer for the Army of the Potomac's III Corps from April to July 1862. During the Peninsula Campaign that March–July, McAlester was singled out twice for his conduct, winning brevets to major and to lieutenant colonel on July 1, 1862.

That fall McAlester was appointed the lead engineer of the Department of Ohio from October 30, 1862 into January 1863, when he joined the Army of the Tennessee to perform the same duty  until August 9. During this time he was promoted to captain in the Regular army to rank from March 3. Then he was lead engineer for the Defenses of Cincinnati from August 9 into July 1864. On July 15 he was made lead engineer of the Federal Department of the Gulf (Military Division of West Mississippi) until July 16, 1865.

McAlester was in Alabama during the sieges of Forts Gaines and Morgan in August 1864, and was appointed a brevet colonel for his performance during these battles on August 23. On March 2, 1867, President Andrew Johnson nominated and the United States Senate confirmed McAlester for appointment to the grade of brevet brigadier general of volunteers, to rank from April 9, 1865, for his conduct during the fight and capture of Mobile at the Battle of Fort Blakely on April 9, 1865.

.

Postbellum
Following the end of the war McAlester chose to continue his career and remained in the small peacetime U.S. Army. He was promoted to major on March 7, 1867. McAlester oversaw the design and construction of the dredge boat Essaysons. He died in Buffalo, New York in 1869.

He was buried in Hollenback Cemetery in Wilkes-Barre, Pennsylvania.

Engineer's plans
During the course of his duties in the Civil War, McAlester prepared several detailed maps of Confederate fortifications the Federals encountered. Two of his plans are shown below, both depicting the defenses and approaches to Confederate-held Fort Blakely at Mobile, Alabama, in 1865. They are included in the Official Records, published in 1892.

The first picture shows seven plans for forts and redans leading to Fort Blakely, while the second picture shows all four major defenses in the surrounding area.

See also

List of American Civil War brevet generals (Union)

References
 Eicher, John H., and Eicher, David J., Civil War High Commands, Stanford University Press, 2001, .

Notes

1833 births
1869 deaths
People from Allegany County, New York
People of New York (state) in the American Civil War
Union Army officers
United States Military Academy alumni
United States Army officers